Cannabis in Washington may refer to:

Cannabis in Washington (state)
Cannabis in Washington, D.C.